The European Wheelchair Handball Nations’ Tournament is the official competition for senior national Wheelchair handball teams of Europe and takes place every year since 2015 (except 2017).

The Netherlands are record champions with two continuous titles which came in 2015 and 2016.

Tournaments

Medal count

Participation details

Statistics

Total hosts

Most Valuable Player

Best Goalkeeper

Top scorers by tournament
The record-holder for scored goals in a single Nations’ Tournament is Ademir Demirovic. He scored 26 goals for Croatia at the 2018 European Wheelchair Handball Nations’ Tournament that took place in Portugal.

All-time top scorers

References

External links
Official homepage of the European Handball Federation

See also
Wheelchair handball
IHF Wheelchair Handball World Championship
Pan American Wheelchair Handball Championship

 
European Handball Federation competitions
Parasports competitions
Wheelchair handball
Recurring sporting events established in 2015
2015 establishments in Europe